Governor Lincoln may refer to:

Enoch Lincoln (1788–1829), Governor of Maine
Levi Lincoln Sr. (1749–1820), Governor of Massachusetts
Levi Lincoln Jr. (1782–1868), Governor of Massachusetts
Gatewood Lincoln (1875–1957), Naval Governor of American Samoa

See also
Lincoln Chafee (born 1953), Governor of Rhode Island
Lincoln Almond (born 1936), Governor of Rhode Island